Saint-Rabier is a commune in the Dordogne department in Nouvelle-Aquitaine in southwestern France.

It was recorded as Sanctus Riberius in Medieval Latin.

Population

See also
Communes of the Dordogne department

References

Communes of Dordogne
Dordogne communes articles needing translation from French Wikipedia